The following lists events from 2014 in Hong Kong.

Incumbents
 Chief Executive - Leung Chun-ying

Events

February
 February 14 - The 2014 Hong Kong Marathon took place. Feyera Gemeda and Rehima Kedir won the men's and women's races in 2:15:05 and 2:34:53 hours, respectively.

March
 March - Hongkonger and Hong Kongese were officially added to the Oxford English Dictionary.
 March 28-30 - 2014 Hong Kong Sevens, a rugby tournament, took place. There were four knockout stages in the tournament and each team that won its knockout stage was declared a champion.

April
 April 13 - 33rd Hong Kong Film Awards took place.

July
 July 1 - An annual Hong Kong March took place. The march featured protest that demanded rights of citizens: democracy, universal suffrage, freedom of speech, etc. Organizers of the march said over 500,000 protesters participated. 
 July - Occupy Central with Love and Peace is a proposed nonviolent occupation protest for universal suffrage. Its date is unknown, but it is scheduled for July.

September
 September 22-26 - Student groups initiated large-scale class boycott campaigns.
 September 27 - Occupy Central with Love and Peace officially started.

November
 November 11 - Following a court injunction authorising the clearance of protest sites, pro-democracy protesters in Hong Kong are warned they could face arrest if they do not leave the sites.
 November 18 - Hong Kong authorities start dismantling a protest site in Admiralty following a court order.
 November 25 - Hong Kong authorities start clearing away barricades in the district of Mong Kok.
 November 26 - More than 80 people are arrested as police dismantle a protest camp in the Mong Kok commercial district. Student leaders Joshua Wong and Lester Shum are amongst those arrested.
 November 27 - The Hong Kong Police Force arrests eleven more people in a second night of violence after removal of a camp in Mong Kok and seven police officers are arrested for alleged assault of a protester on October 15.
 November 29 - Thousands of pro-democracy demonstrators clash with police in the Mong Kok district as they try to reclaim their former protest site.

December
 December 1 - Pro-democracy demonstrators and the Hong Kong Police Force clash outside the headquarters of the Government of Hong Kong. Dozens of people are arrested.
 December 2 - C. Y. Leung, the Chief Executive of Hong Kong, warns pro-democracy activists not to return to the streets after yesterday's clashes.

Deaths

January
 5 January - Peter Rull Sr., 91, Hong Kong Olympic sport shooter.
 7 January - Run Run Shaw, Hong Kong filmmaker and entrepreneur (b. 1907)

February
 4 February - Wu Ma, 71, Chinese-born Hong Kong actor and director, lung cancer.

May
 25 May - Tang Yuhan, 101, Hong Kong oncologist.
 30 May - Joan Lorring, 88, British Hong Kong-born American actress (The Corn Is Green, Three Strangers).

June
 4 June - George Ho, 94, American-born Chinese Hong Kong media owner (Commercial Television and Radio), recipient of the Gold Bauhinia Star (2001).

July
 4 July - Li Fook-wo, 97, Hong Kong politician and banker (Bank of East Asia).
 14 July - Sir Jimmy McGregor, 90, British colonial politician, member of the Hong Kong Executive Council (1995–1997) and Legislative Council (1988–1995).
 24 July - Ian Rees Davies, 72, British dentist and university administrator, Vice-Chancellor of the University of Hong Kong (2000–2002).
 25 July - Cheng Yang-ping, 84, Hong Kong simultaneous interpreter, Chief Interpreter (1972–1986) and Chief Conference Interpreter (1986–1987) of the Hong Kong Government.

August
 16 August - Tsang Shu-ki, 64, Hong Kong economist and social activist (Meeting Point).

September
 13 September - Marvin Cheung, 67, Hong Kong accountant and politician, Chairman of the AAHK (2008–2014), unofficial member of the Executive Council (2005–2012), leukemia.

November
 16 November - Sik Kok Kwong, 95, Hong Kong Buddhist monk, President of the Hong Kong Buddhist Association (1966–2014).
 20 November - Jimmy Heung, 64, Hong Kong film producer and director, cancer.

December
 27 December - Ronald Li, 85, Chinese stockbroker, Chairman of the Hong Kong Stock Exchange (1986–1987), cancer.
 29 December
 Hari Harilela, 92, Indian-born Hong Kong hotelier.
 Jenny Pat, 33, Hong Kong art dealer, accidental drug overdose.

See also
List of Hong Kong films of 2014
2014 Hong Kong electoral reform consultation
Hong Kong at the 2014 Winter Olympics
2013–14 Hong Kong First Division League
2013–14 Hong Kong FA Cup

References

 
Years of the 21st century in Hong Kong
Hong Kong
Hong Kong